Marks Tey is a large village  and electoral ward in Essex, England; it is located six miles west of Colchester.

Facilities
Marks Tey is one of a group of villages called the Teys, also including Great Tey and Little Tey. Its main features include a village hall built in 1993 on the fields intersecting the A12 and A120, with an adjacent children's play park and a skateboard park. Next to that (between A12 & A120) is a suburban estate that was built in the mid-1970s. Near to the play park, there is a small parish hall, used for children's kindergarten and small exhibitions. The hall was almost doubled in size after the extension of the new Basketball hall.

The village has a parish church, St Andrew's. The church hall is central to the community, and hosts 1st Marks Tey Scouts  Group with Beavers, Cubs and Scouts.

Following the demolition of the Prince of Wales public house, the Red Lion was the only pub serving the village but recently closed down during the Covid-19 pandemic. In 2001 The Food Company erected their first outlet on the site of the former Prince of Wales, selling speciality foods and drink - however the business closed in 2017.  The premises were refurbished in 2021 and are now the Commercial Hub for regional solicitors, Holmes and Hills LLP. Also located on London Road are a post office, convenience store, fish and chip shop, Indian & Chinese take-aways, a butchers, bakers, hairdressers, a cycle shop, a car supplies shop, a petrol garage and Marks Tey Pharmacy.

Marks Tey Football Club was established in 1998. The home ground is Jubilee Playing Fields in Old London Road, alongside the skateboard park. They currently have one men's Saturday team, one men's Sunday team, one veterans' team, two youth teams, and two mini football teams.

Transport

Marks Tey railway station is on the Great Eastern Main Line between London Liverpool Street and Ipswich; it is also a junction and eastern terminus for the Sudbury Branch Line. Passenger trains are operated by Greater Anglia. Services run generally half-hourly in each way to Liverpool Street southbound and to Colchester and Ipswich northbound, with hourly services on the branch line to Sudbury.

Bus services are provided by the 370/371 First Bus service between Chelmsford and Colchester.

The village is located beside the A12 dual carriageway, which connects east London with Lowestoft.

References

External links

Villages in Essex